DLR may refer to:

Companies and organizations
 , the first German airline
 , a German radio network
  or DLR Kultur, a German radio station
 German Aerospace Center
 DLR Group, a U.S. engineering and design firm

Mathematics and technology
 Design layout record, of telecommunication circuit
 Displacement–length ratio of a vessel
 Dynamic Language Runtime, Microsoft software

Transportation
 Docklands Light Railway, London, England

Other uses
 DLR Band, an album by David Lee Roth
 Arise the Republic, a political party in France
 Dicționarul Limbii Române, the most comprehensive dictionary of the Romanian language
 DLR Lexicon, Dún Laoghaire, Ireland library
 Diamond League Records, abbreviation for records in the Diamond League